Robert Emmet Tehan (January 7, 1905November 27, 1975) was an American attorney, Democratic politician, and United States federal judge.  He was a U.S. District Judge for the Eastern District of Wisconsin from 1949 to 1971, and was Chief Judge from 1954 to 1971.  He previously served twelve years in the Wisconsin Legislature.

Education and career

Born in Milwaukee, Wisconsin, Tehan received an Artium Baccalaureus degree from Marquette University in 1927. He received a Bachelor of Laws from Marquette University Law School in 1929. He was in private practice in Wisconsin from 1930 to 1949. He was a member of the Wisconsin State Assembly from 1937 to 1942. He was a member of the Wisconsin State Senate from 1942 to 1948.

Federal judicial service

Tehan was nominated by President Harry S. Truman on April 5, 1949, to a seat on the United States District Court for the Eastern District of Wisconsin vacated by Judge F. Ryan Duffy. He was confirmed by the United States Senate on May 17, 1949, and received his commission two days later. He served as Chief Judge from 1954 to 1971. He assumed senior status on June 30, 1971. Tehan served until his death on November 27, 1975, in Milwaukee.

References

Sources
 

1905 births
1975 deaths
Marquette University alumni
Marquette University Law School alumni
Lawyers from Milwaukee
Wisconsin state senators
Members of the Wisconsin State Assembly
Judges of the United States District Court for the Eastern District of Wisconsin
United States district court judges appointed by Harry S. Truman
20th-century American judges
20th-century American politicians